The European Gaming and Amusement Federation (EUROMAT) is a Brussels-based federation of European trade associations representing the gaming and amusement industry at European Union level.

Organisation

History
The European Gaming and Amusement Federation (EUROMAT) was established in 1979. Its secretariat is located in Brussels, the capital city of Belgium and the de facto capital of the European Union (EU). Although EUROMAT mainly follows European political developments, it also endeavours to monitor international developments as they happen.

Structure
The federation currently (2015) represents 18 national member associations from 13 European countries (including two observers). EUROMAT is supported by a secretariat based in Brussels, as well as an Executive Committee.

In July 2015, Eduardo Antoja, of the Asociación Española de Empresarios de Máquinas Recreativas (FACOMARE), was elected president of EUROMAT, replacing Annette Kok, of the Vereniging Automatenhandel Nederland (VAN).

Mission
The overall mission of the Federation is to contribute to the creation of a healthy business and legal environment for the gaming industry in the EU.

EUROMAT instigates dialogue with the European Union and other pan-European bodies, with whom it hopes to use its position and membership to stimulate debate and awareness. The federation also monitors and attempts to influence the European regulations on legal, commercial and technical aspects of the business to guarantee the best possible future for the gaming sector, by giving one voice to its members on all matters affecting the industry.

As well as defending the interests of the gaming industry by providing continued and accurate information on the gaming sector to citizens, European media and national administrations, EUROMAT supports all its member associations in their efforts to adopt, promote and enforce the appropriate code of conduct for themselves and their associates.

Activities
Much of the Federation's work consists of monitoring EU developments and keeping member associations informed on upcoming legislation which may potentially affect them. The organisation also collates and distributes information on the amusement industry on a regular basis .

Membership
EUROMAT's members range from operators, manufacturers, distributors and owners of amusement equipment.

As of July 2015, the following national associations are member organisations of EUROMAT. Two of them, ASL Interactifs (France) and MSZSZ (Hungary), currently enjoy observer member status.

Publications
Since its foundation in 1979, EUROMAT has published books and brochures discussing the status of gambling issues at the EU-level, such as:
 Responsible Gaming|Responsible Gambling: A statement of principles and a showcase of best practice from the European gaming and amusement industry (2009) - link to publication.
 The Future of Gaming and Amusement in Europe: A collection of essays (2006) - link to publication
 Playing Fair: Social Responsibility in Gaming (2015) - link to publication

References

External links
EUROMAT (official website)

Pan-European trade and professional organizations
Organizations established in 1979